Fudbalski klub Partizan is a Serbian professional association football club based in Belgrade, Serbia, who currently play in the Serbian SuperLiga. They have played at their current home ground, Partizan Stadium, since 1949.

This is a list of all the football players that have played for club since its foundation, in 1945.

Only players that have played at least one match in any of the following competitions: domestic league, domestic cup and European competitions.

Players that only played in friendlies, tournaments and that were on trial are not included.


A

 Branislav Aćimović
 Rodoljub Aćimović
 Dominic Adiyiah 8/0 (2011)
 Admir Aganović 0/0 (2004–2007) 1 game in Cup
 Nikola Aksentijević 36/1 (2010–2014)
 Živan Aleksić
 Anderson Marques 2/1 (2011–2012)
 Živodrag Andrić 1/1 (1956–1957)
 Radomir Antić 196/9 (1970–1977)
 Nemanja Antonov 14/1 (2017–2018)
 Goran Arnaut 7/0 (1997–1998, 1999–2000)
 Dragan Arsenović 55/1 (1974–1979)
 Ljubiša Arsenović 9/0 (1953–1955)
 Živko Arsić
 Takuma Asano 77/30 (2019–2021)
 Nikolas Asprogenis 19/0 (2005–2007)
 Stefan Aškovski 3/2 (2012–2013)
 Aleksandar Atanacković 136/24 (1946–1954)
 Branislav Atanacković 2/0 (2004–2005)
 Velimir Atanacković

B

 Dejan Babić 6/0 (2011–2013)
 Milan Babić 14/0 (1980–1981)
 Stefan Babović 157/26 (2003–2006, 2010–2012, 2015)
 Macky Bagnack 18/0 (2020–2021)
 Jean-Christophe Bahebeck 8/1 (2020–2021)
 Branimir Bajić 159/7 (2000–2007)
 Mane Bajić 188/19 (1962–1970)
 Milorad Bajović 43/10 (1985–1986, 1987–1988, 1989–1990))
 Miodrag Bajović 115/3 (1985–1990)
 Gregor Balažic 51/1 (2015–2017)
 Srđan Baljak 2/0 (1999–2000)
 Ivan Bandalovski 47/1 (2014–2016)
 Slavko Banduka
 Zoran Batrović 47/16 (1987–1989)
 Miladin Bečanović 56/17 (2000–2003)
 Radoslav Bečejac 107/18 (1963–1967)
 Stevan Becin
 Belić
 Bruno Belin 240/18 (1951–1962)
 Budimir Belojević
 Božidar Belojević 16/0 (1952–1955)
 Darko Belojević 16/0 (1984–1989)
 Rahim Beširović 36/12 (1995–1996)
 Veljko Birmančević 3/0 (2015–2016)
 Nenad Bjeković 210/86 (1969–1976)
 Nenad Bjeković Jr. 68/17 (1991–1995, 1998–1999)
 Blagojević
 Dragoljub Blažić 20/3 (1957–1959)
 Stjepan Bobek 239/170 (1946–1959)
 Todor Bogdanović
 Goran Bogdanović 187/17 (1985–1993)
 Gradimir Bogojevac 12/0 (1951)
 Miroslav Bogosavac 26/0 (2015–2017)
 Miloš Bogunović 73/12 (2008–2011)
 Valeri Bojinov 67/25 (2015–2017)
 Dražen Bolić 114/21 (1994–1998)
 Petar Borota 84/0 (1976–1979)
 Ranko Borozan 48/3 (1954–1957)
 Bosanac
 Miloš Bosančić 26/0 (2006–2007)
 Miroslav Bošković 38/4 (1973–1975)
 Pierre Boya 101/17 (2003–2007, 2010–2011)
 Darko Božović 29/0 (2007–2009)
 Mladen Božović 95/0 (2008–2010)
 Branislav Branilović
 Vladimir Branković 2/0 (2008–2009)
 Darko Brašanac 115/10 (2009–2016)
 Rajko Brežančić 35/1 (2007-2010,2019-2022)
 Bojan Brnović 20/2 (2003–2005)
 Branko Brnović 116/20 (1991–1994)
 Dragoljub Brnović 39/4 (1988–1989)
 Nenad Brnović 69/8 (2004–2006)
 Zenun Brovina 1/0 (1963–1964)
 Miroslav Brozović 40/2 (1946–1948)
 Jovica Budisavljević 1/0 (1971–1972)
 Nikola Budišić 111/0 (1967–1974)
 Predrag Burčul 1/0 (1967–1968)

C

 Zvonko Canjuga 1/0 (1947–1948)
 Petar Cestić
 Cléo 67/42 (2009–2011)
 Luka Cucin 5/0 (2017–2019)
 Zoran Cvetanović 20/1 (1970–1975)
 Nenad Cvetković 48/12 (1972–1975)

Ć

 Marko Ćetković 10/0 (2007–2008)
 Dragan Ćirić 193/52 (1992–1997, 2004–2005)
 Milovan Ćirić
 Zoran Ćirić 8/0 (1997–1998)
 Lazar Ćirković 49/0 (2014–2018)
 Milivoje Ćirković 142/2 (1999–2007)
 Jovan Ćurčić 11/0 (1963–1965)
 Saša Ćurčić 89/19 (1993–1995)
 Željko Ćurčić
 Michael Ćurčija 1/0 (2000–2001)
 Ivan Ćurković 227/0 (1964–1972)

Č

 Ivan Čabrinović
 Dragan Čadikovski 23/5 (2007–2009)
 Zlatko Čajkovski 190/28 (1946–1955)
 Damir Čakar 174/73 (1995–1997, 2001–2004)
 Vlado Čapljić 58/4 (1985–1988)
 Srđan Čebinac 20/8 (1956–1960)
 Zvezdan Čebinac 107/12 (1958–1964)
 Miroslav Čermelj 24/0 (1993–1995)
 Latif Čičić 10/0 (1968–1969)
 Ratko Čolić 142/0 (1946–1956)
 Borko Čudović 3/0 (1954–1955)
 Dejan Čurović 41/25 (1993–1994)

D

 Nikola Damjanac 102/0 (1992–1993, 1994–1997, 1998–2000)
 Milan Damjanović 175/1 (1962–1971)
 Darmanović
 Aleksandar Davidov 41/4 (2009–2011)
 Dimitri Davidovic 25/0 (1963–1967)
 Andrija Delibašić 126/63 (1999–2003)
 Lamine Diarra 151/75 (2007–2010, 2011–2012)
 Zoran Dimitrijević 75/8 (1981–1985)
 Eric Djemba-Djemba 16/0 (2013–2014)
 Rajko Dotlić
 Božidar Drenovac 34/2 (1947–1953)
 Nikola Drinčić 56/5 (2003–2004, 2014–2015)
 Slavko Drljača 2/0 (1969–1970)
 Ljubinko Drulović 38/6 (2003–2004)
 Igor Duljaj 207/6 (1997–2004)
 Dunai
 Mario Duplančić 3/0 (1952–1953)
 Josip Duvančić 22/4 (1956–1958)

Đ

 Danilo Đaković
 Đambas
 Milenko Đedović 2/0 (1995–1996)
 Miloš Đelmaš 162/25 (1979–1987)
 Armin Đerlek 32/1 (2017–2019)
 Aleksandar Đoković 1/0 (2008–2009)
 Borivoje Đorđević 195/22 (1965–1975)
 Boško Đorđević 138/35 (1972–1980)
 Nenad Đorđević 204/18 (2003–2009)
 Svemir Đorđić 202/33 (1968–1976)
 Branislav Đukanović 33/0 (1987–1988)
 Nenad Đukanović 18/0 (1996–1998)
 Milonja Đukić 74/15 (1984–1986, 1988–1989)
 Slađan Đukić 13/1 (1990–1991)
 Vladislav Đukić 67/24 (1988–1989, 1990–1992)
 Aleksandar Đurđević
 Milan Đurđević 59/19 (1989–1991)
 Milivoje Đurđević 17/0 (1946–1947)
 Uroš Đurđević 45/35 (2016–2017)
 Nikola Đurđić 17/1 (2016–2017)
 Zoran Đurić 68/6 (1994–1996)
 Živko Đurić
 Saša Đuričić 2/0 (1993–1994)
 Petar Đuričković 40/2 (2016–2017)
 Borislav Đurović 153/4 (1975–1980)
 Milko Đurovski 83/45 (1986–1990)

E

 Ednilson 16/0 (2008)
 Eduardo Pacheco 25/5 (2011–2012)
 Mohamed El Monir 7/0 (2016–2017)
 Eliomar 7/0 (2012–2013)
 Ifeanyi Emeghara 56/0 (2004–2006)
 Gabriel Enache 15/2 (2018–2019)
 Eraković
 Slobodan Eskić
 Everton Luiz 72/3 (2016–2018)

F

 Fabrício Dornellas 22/0 (2015–2016)
 Ljubomir Fejsa 96/2 (2008–2011, 2022-)
 Tomislav Filipović 4/0 (1967–1968)
 Vladimir Firm 34/3 (1946–1949)
 Ismaël Béko Fofana 22/8 (2013–2016)
 Koriolan Foljan
 Funtek
 Mladen Furtula 23/0 (1970–1973)

G

 Ivan Gajić 1/0 (1994–1995)
 Milan Galić 180/95 (1958–1966)
 Ivan Gašpar
 Goran Gavrančić 27/0 (2009–2010)
 Marjan Gerasimovski 65/5 (1998–2001)
 Đorđe Gerum
 Franjo Glaser 16/0 (1946–1947)
 Nemanja Glavčić 3/0 (2015–2016)
 Cédric Gogoua 12/1 (2016)
 Ivan Golac 125/3 (1971–1978)
 Marko Golubović 17/2 (2015–2016)
 Ricardo Gomes 139/87 (2018–2019, 2021–)
 Petar Grbić 68/6 (2013–2016)
 Milomir Grbin
 Rajko Grčević 3/0 (1947–1950)
 Todor Grebenarević 1/0 (1965–1966)
 Nikola Grubješić 49/15 (2003–2006)
 Pavle Grubješić 139/28 (1970–1981)
 Todor Grujić
 Nebojša Gudelj 123/10 (1991–1994)
 Nikola Gulan 26/0 (2006–2007, 2013–2015)

H

 Hajdarević
 Mustafa Hasanagić 133/73 (1961–1969)
 Jusuf Hatunić 118/0 (1976–1981)
 Antun Herceg 163/44 (1951–1958)
 Bogdan Hiblović
 Drago Hmelina 12/6 (1954–1956)
 Edvard Hočevar 3/2 (1950)
 Filip Holender 69/11 (2020-2022)
 Horvat
 Idriz Hošić 82/38 (1966–1970)
 Gjorgji Hristov 77/27 (1994–1997)
 Vítor Hugo 4/0 (2007–2008)

I

 Brana Ilić 46/8 (2009–2010)
 Branko Ilić 41/4 (2014–2015)
 Radiša Ilić 102/0 (1998–2003, 2010–2013)
 Saša Ilić 7/0 (1993–1995)
 Saša Ilić 604/159  (1996–2005, 2010–2019)
 Ivica Iliev 239/70 (1997–2004, 2010–2011)
 Filip Ilišić 1/0 (2010–2011)
 Dragan Isailović 36/20 (1997–1998)
 Blagoje Istatov 50/0 (1973–1976)
 Radmilo Ivančević 74/0 (1975–1977, 1979–1981)
 Ivan Ivanov 83/10 (2011–2013)
 Đorđe Ivanović 70/17 (2017–2020)
 Velimir Ivanović 6/0 (2000–2001)
 Ivanovski
 Vladimir Ivić 176/66 (1998–2004)
 Saša Ivković 2/0 (2013–2014)

J

 Safet Jahič 7/0 (2006–2007)
 Lajoš Jakovetić 64/2 (1947–1952)
 Dejan Jakšić
 Stevan Jakuš 5/0 (1946–1949)
 Orhan Jamaković
 Jane Janevski 6/1 (1946–1947)
 Marko Janković 101/13 (2016–2019)
 Jankulov
 Slave Jankulovski
 Tika Jelisavčić 2/1 (1953–1954)
 Dragoljub Jeremić 80/1 (1997–1998, 2000–2005)
 Milorad Jeremić 13/0 (1966–1967)
 Miodrag Ješić 170/14 (1980–1985, 1990–1991)
 Goran Jevtić 4/0 (1989–1990)
 Marko Jevtović 122/12 (2015–2018, 2022)
 Jovan Jezerkić 9/9 (1947–1948)
 Jia Xiuquan 19/0 (1987–1989)
 Stanoje Jocić 50/25 (1954–1957)
 Vladimir Jocić 19/0 (1979–1981)
 Dragan Jojić
 Miloš Jojić 133/22 (2012-2014, 2020-2022)
 Slaviša Jokanović 82/26 (1990–1993)
 Dejan Joksimović 15/3 (1989–1990)
 Igor Joksimović
 Aleksandar Jončić 73/0 (1956–1964)
 Vladimir Jovančić 16/1 (2011–2012)
 Branislav Jovanović 27/0 (2009–2011)
 Dragoslav Jovanović 36/0 (1958–1964)
 Đorđe Jovanović 26/4 (2016-2018)
 Marko Jovanović 103/2 (2007–2011, 2015–2016)
 Miodrag Jovanović 183/1 (1946–1956)
 Jovanovski
 Stevan Jovetić 61/23 (2005–2008)
 Marko Jovičić 16/0 (2015–2018)
 Milan Jović 13/1 (1994–1996)
 Milovan Jović 39/7 (1977–1980)
 Nemanja Jović
 Nemanja Jovšić 5/0 (2004–2007)
 Juca 59/10 (2007–2009)
 Juraj Jurak
 Svetozar Jurišić
 Fahrudin Jusufi 195/2 (1957–1966)
 Vjekoslav Juvan

K

 Dragi Kaličanin 101/9 (1980–1985)
 Tomislav Kaloperović 130/34 (1955–1961)
 Mohamed Kamara 79/0 (2010–2013)
 Radenko Kamberović 3/0 (2010)
 Milan Kantardžić
 Ninoslav Kapamadžija
 Slavko Karanović 1/0 (1983–1984)
 Petar Kasom 1/0 (1999–2000)
 Srečko Katanec 64/9 (1986–1988)
 Ilija Katić 144/30 (1968–1973)
 Katinčić
 Mateja Kežman 74/43 (1998–2000)
 Kim Chi-woo 8/0 (2004–2005)
 Pavle Kiš 1/0 (1958–1959)
 Joseph Kizito 17/0 (2010–2011)
 Nikica Klinčarski 298/20 (1976–1985, 1987–1989)
 Miloje Kljajević 16/0 (1988–1990)
 Filip Kljajić 55/0 (2014–2020)
 Filip Knežević 1/0 (2012–2013)
 Miodrag Knežević 15/0 (1971–1972)
 Srđa Knežević 83/2 (2007–2010)
 Nemanja Kojić 55/17 (2013–2016)
 Božidar Kolaković 37/1 (1950–1954)
 Jovica Kolb 40/1 (1984–1990)
 Dragan Komnenović 1/0 (1957–1958)
 Stipan Kopilović 2/0 (1947–1948)
 Ivan Koren
 Aleksandar Kosorić 2/0 (2008–2009)
 Nebojša Kosović 81/5 (2015–2019)
 Novica Kostić  11/0 (1981–1983)
 Koščičarić
 Milenče Kovačević
 Tomislav Kovačević 57/0 (1976–1980)
 Vladica Kovačević 226/105 (1958–1966, 1967–1970)
 Kovjanić
 Refik Kozić 183/15 (1972–1980)
 Mehmed Krajišnik
 Mitar Krajšić
 Ivica Kralj 197/0 (1995–1998, 2000–2001, 2003–2007)
 Milan Kranjčić 14/0 (1958–1960)
 Slobodan Krčmarević 72/29 (1983–1984, 1991–1993)
 Krgin
 Mladen Krstajić 180/17 (1995–2000, 2009–2011)
 Nijaz Kulenović
 Rešad Kunovac 110/4 (1975–1981)
 Milojko Kurčubić 3/0 (1971–1974)
 Nenad Kutlačić
 Stevica Kuzmanovski 3/0 (1982–1983)

L

 Nikola Lakčević
 Risto Lakić 2/0 (2007–2008)
 Petar Lalić
 Čedomir Lazarević 129/3 (1947–1959)
 Mladen Lazarević 12/0 (2006–2008)
 Žarko Lazetić 34/7 (2007–2008)
 Aleksandar Lazevski 75/3 (2007–2013)
 Lazić
 Đorđe Lazić 73/8 (2006–2009)
 Predrag Lazić 22/1 (2006–2008)
 Vlada Lazičić 32/0 (1978–1981)
 Lazović
 Danko Lazović 118/46 (2000–2003, 2006, 2014–2015)
 Dragan Lečić
 Nikola Leković 8/0 (2015–2016)
 Leonardo 41/27 (2016–2017)
 Ranko Leškov
 Ivan Ličanin
 Nebojša Ličanin 7/0 (1968–1970)
 Zoran Lilić 25/0 (1980–1983)
 Liu Haiguang 7/3 (1987–1989)
 Adem Ljajić 57/12 (2008–2010)
 Darko Ljubanović 7/0 (1997–1998)
 Marko Lomić 100/7 (2005–2007, 2009–2010)
 Saša Lopičić 1/0 (1983–1984)
 Goran Lovre 8/0 (2012–2013)
 Predrag Luka 62/10 (2013–2016)
 Milan Lukač 46/0 (2013–2015)
 Ilija Lukić
 Saša Lukić 33/2 (2014–2016)
 Bratislav Luković
 Aleksandar Lutovac 89/3 (2019–2023)

M

 Ferenc Makó
 Nikola Malbaša 54/3 (2002–2004)
 Filip Malbašić 25/2 (2013–2014)
 Darko Maletić 52/4 (2006–2009)
 Dragan Mance 134/47 (1980–1985)
 Milorad Mandić
 David Manga 11/1 (2011–2012)
 Nikola Manjko
 Danijel Marčeta 2/0 (2008–2009)
 Đuro Marić 33/1 (1969–1972)
 Nebojša Marinković 47/18 (2003–2004, 2005–2008)
 Nenad Marinković 36/2 (2004–2007, 2008–2009, 2014–2015)
 Petar Marinković
 Dragomir Marjanović
 Nikola Marjanović 24/0 (1984–1985)
 Saša Marjanović 12/0 (2016–2018)
 Dejan Marković 29/1 (1989–1993)
 Lazar Marković 154/35 (2011-2013, 2019-2022)
 Marko Marković
 Miroslav Marković
 Ratomir Marković
 Saša Marković 88/11 (2011–2015)
 Svetozar Marković 109/9 (2017–2019, 2020–2021, 2022-)
 Vojislav Marković 13/0 (1967–1971)
 Marko Markovski 10/2 (2006–2007)
 Zoran Martinović
 Sead Mašić 52/0 (1978–1985)
 Florijan Matekalo 7/2 (1946–1947)
 Milan Matić 2/0 (1971–1973)
 Jovan Matković
 Dragutin Mehandžić
 Mihalj Mesaroš
 Miloš Mihajlov 41/1 (2006–2008)
 Branislav Mihajlović 107/51 (1955–1965)
 Branko Mihajlović 1/0 (2008–2009)
 Ljubomir Mihajlović 218/2 (1961–1970)
 Milan Mihajlović
 Nemanja Mihajlović 51/10 (2015–2017)
 Prvoslav Mihajlović 168/70 (1946–1957)
 Bratislav Mijalković 122/1 (1990–1996)
 Petar Mijatović 4/1 (1956–1957)
 Predrag Mijatović 134/51 (1990–1993)
 Predrag Mijić 4/0 (2010)
 Jovan Miladinović 135/15 (1956–1966)
 Darko Milanič 134/3 (1986–1993)
 Predrag Milanović
 Slobodan Milanović
 Nikola Milenković 44/4 (2015–2017)
 Miroslav Miletić
 Nemanja Miletić 99/3 (2016–2019)
 Nemanja Miletić 166/9 (2017–2020, 2021–2022)
 Slobodan Miletić 34/2 (1989–1990, 1991–1992)
 Zlatko Milić 56/0 (1972–1975)
 Nebojša Miličić 1/0 (1978–1979)
 Milan Milijaš 5/0 (2000–2001)
 Zoran Milinković 2/0 (1990–1991)
 Marko Milovanović 27/3 (2021-2022)
 Aleksandar Miljković 146/3 (2007–2013, 2020–2022)
 Slobodan Miljković 1/0 (1969–1970)
 Vojkan Miljković 1/0 (2008–2009)
 Goran Milojević 82/24 (1988–1990)
 Stanoje Miloradović 1/0 (1961–1962)
 Savo Milošević 119/78 (1992–1995)
 Boris Milošević 2/0 (1984–1985)
 Milovan Milović 27/1 (2004–2006)
 Bora Milutinović 53/6 (1960–1966, 1971–1972)
 Milorad Milutinović 76/1 (1956–1963)
 Miloš Milutinović 100/73 (1952–1957)
 Stevan Milutinović
 Uroš Milutinović
 Nemanja Mirković
 Spasoje Mirković
 Zoran Mirković 169/3 (1993–1996, 2003–2006)
 Nenad Mirosavljević 15/2 (2006–2007)
 Nenad Mišković 80/5 (1998–2004)
 Ilija Mitić 43/4 (1958–1963)
 Aleksandar Mitrović 42/18 (2012–2013)
 Milan Mitrović 24/2 (2016–2017)
 Nikola Mitrović 18/0 (2006–2007)
 Slobodan Mitrović
 Mladenović
 Almani Moreira 132/30 (2007–2011)
 Petar Mrđa 2/0 (1965–1966)
 Mrvaljević
 Srđan Mulćan 1/0 (2010–2011)
 Siniša Mulina 13/2 (1996–1997)

N

 Albert Nađ 258/16 (1992–1996, 2002–2007)
 Branko Nadoveza 23/0 (1969–1970)
 Ljubomir Nanušević 
 Bibras Natcho 155/50 (2019–)
 Aleksandar Nedović 5/1 (2000–2004)
 Alexis Ngambi 3/0 (2008–2009)
 Zoran Nikitović 7/0 (1978–1980)
 Radosav Nikodijević 30/1 (1984–1986)
 Nemanja Nikolić 36/8 (2018–2019)
 Rista Nikolić/Nikolovski
 Simo Nikolić 13/3 (1974–1977)
 Vladan Nikolić
 Asen Nikolov 3/0 (2006–2007)
 Nikola Ninković 121/17 (2011–2016)
 Moussa Njie 2/0 (2018–2019)
 Norković
 Džoni Novak 41/5 (1990–1992)
 Ajazdin Nuhi 29/0 (2001–2003)

O

 Goran Obradović 111/39 (1996–2000)
 Ivan Obradović 111/3 (2006-2009,2020-2022)
 Milan Obradović 29/1 (2013–2014)
 Obiora Odita 68/24 (2004–2007)
 Dejan Ognjanović 42/2 (2001–2004)
 Radivoje Ognjanović 19/2 (1952–1953, 1961–1962)
 Žarko Olarević 25/1 (1967–1969, 1971–1972)
 Fahrudin Omerović 266/0 (1984–1992)
 Bojan Ostojić 130/4 (2016-2022)
 Miloš Ostojić 57/3 (2011–2016)
 Aboubakar Oumarou 26/10 (2015–2016)
 Ognjen Ožegović 56/18 (2017–2019)

P

 Božidar Pajević 177/9 (1953–1961)
 Milutin Pajević 26/8 (1948–1951)
 Milorad Pajković
 Tomislav Pajović 7/0 (2012–2013)
 Bela Palfi 34/5 (1946–1948)
 Goran Pandurović 149/1 (1989–1995)
 Danilo Pantić 149/19 (2012–15, 2017–19, 2021–)
 Đorđe Pantić 38/0 (2001–2007)
 Milinko Pantić 76/8 (1985–1988, 1989–1991)
 Branko Pauljević 7/0 (2012–2013)
 Blagoje Paunović 254/2 (1965–1975)
 Slavoljub Paunović
 Veljko Paunović 36/3 (1994–1995, 2008–2009)
 Slobodan Pavković
 Lazar Pavlović 63/4 (2019–2022)
 Strahinja Pavlović 57/2 (2018–2020)
 Predrag Pažin 78/8 (1995–1999)
 Branko Pejović
 Vlada Pejović 178/0 (1967–1978)
 Dejan Peković 17/2 (1995–1997)
 Milorad Peković 54/5 (1999–2001)
 Srećko Perčin
 Milan Perić 3/0 (2008–2009)
 Vukan Perović 31/8 (1975–1977)
 Blažo Pešikan 1/0 (1992–1993)
 Periša Pešukić 2/0 (2019–2020)
 Vladimir Petković 1/0 (1995–1996)
 Borislav Petrić 5/0 (1981–1982)
 Gordan Petrić 140/6 (1988–1994)
 Aleksandar Petrović 1/0 (2001–2002)
 Branimir Petrović 24/1 (2004–2006)
 Ivan Petrović 1/0 (2014–2015)
 Marko Petrović
 Miomir Petrović 26/0 (1948–1950)
 Miodrag Petrović
 Miroslav Petrović
 Nemanja Petrović 56/1 (2013–2016)
 Nikola Petrović 21/0 (2011–2013)
 Radosav Petrović 107/20 (2008–2011)
 Slobodan Dane Petrović 108/9 (1967–1971)
 Vladimir Petrović 7/0 (1961–1963)
 Ivan Pilko 
 Josip Pirmajer 142/32 (1964–1968)
 Momčilo Pivić
 Plazinić
 Ivica Pogarčić 5/1 (1967–1968)
 Miroslav Polak 9/0 (1976–1978)
 Virgil Popescu 18/0 (1946–1948)
 Aleksandar Popović
 Branislav Popović
 Ranko Popović 2/0 (1990–1991)
 Zvonko Popović 56/2 (1980–1985)
 Marko Požega
 Miodrag Pregelj 
 Xhevat Prekazi 171/22 (1975–1983)
 Ljuan Prekazi 44/3 (1967–1969)
 Dragoslav Profirović 1/0 (1965–1966)

R

 Nikola Racić
 Zoran Racić
 Dejan Radak 1/0 (1992–1993)
 Miloš Radaković 211/5 (1965–1973)
 Radovan Radaković 78/0 (2000–2004)
 Ljubomir Radanović 197/16 (1981–1988)
 Dejan Rađenović 2/0 (1992–1993)
 Milan Radin 31/0 (2016–2018)
 Ivan Radivojević 2/0 (1990–1991)
 Slavko Radojković 11/0 (1973–1974)
 Dženan Radončić 7/0 (2003–2004)
 Srđan Radonjić 68/40 (2004–2007)
 Aleksandar Radosavljević 11/0 (2007–2008, 2009–2010)
 Dragan Radosavljević 14/0 (2006–2007)
 Ivan Radovanović 2/0 (2006–2007)
 Milan Radovanović
 Lazar Radović 102/18 (1958–1965)
 Miodrag Radović 173/4 (1976–1987)
 Miroslav Radović 82/13 (2003–2006, 2016)
 Radomir Radulović 15/0 (1982–1985)
 Momčilo Radunović 21/4 (1946–1949)
 Ivan Rajić 9/2 (1961–1963)
 Aleksandar Ranković 6/0 (2011–2012)
 Ljubiša Ranković 87/8 (1996–2002)
 Branko Rašović 112/1 (1964–1969)
 Vuk Rašović 101/9 (1992–1993, 1998–2002)
 Miroslav Rede 10/2 (1956–1959)
 Vasil Ringov 1/0 (1973–1974)
 Nemanja Rnić 139/3 (2003–2008, 2011–2012)
 Slobodan Rojević 167/1 (1981–1986)
 Antun Rudinski 10/6 (1962–1964)
 Antonio Rukavina 36/4 (2006–2008)
 Vladimir Ruman 8/0 (1951–1955)
 Franjo Rupnik 18/13 (1946–1947)
 Dejan Rusmir 16/0 (2001–2003)
 Tomasz Rząsa 25/0 (2003–2004)

S

 Zoltan Sabo 85/1 (1996–2000)
 Srećko Sabov 
 Umar Sadiq 52/23 (2019–2020)
 Isa Sadriu 23/0 (1985–1987)
 Enver Salihodžić 6/0 (1973–1974)
 Slobodan Santrač 72/35 (1978–1980)
 Sead Sarajlić 11/0 (1983)
 Niša Saveljić 113/18 (1995–1997, 2000–2001, 2005–2006)
 Branko Savić 162/2 (1997–2000, 2001–2004)
 Stefan Savić 28/1 (2010–2011)
 Božidar Senčar 24/7 (1946–1950)
 Petar Sević 
 Milovan Sikimić 12/0 (2007–2009)
 Mirko Sikimić
 Vojislav Simeunović 1/0 (1964–1965)
 Kiril Simonovski 68/23 (1946–1949)
 Miroslav Sibinović
 Dragomir Slišković 17/1 (1960–1964)
 Admir Smajić 221/10 (1980–1988)
 Andreja Smileski
 Zoran Smileski 24/3 (1967–1969, 1971–1972)
 Milan Smiljanić 195/4 (2005-2007,2010-2013,2018-2022)
 Theophilus Solomon 10/0 (2017–2018)
 Velimir Sombolac 105/0 (1959–1965)
 Dušan Sopić
 Seydouba Soumah 114/27 (2017–2021)
 Igor Spasić 3/0 (1990–1991)
 Predrag Spasić 78/3 (1988–1990)
 Momčilo Spasojević 6/2 (1954–1960)
 Dimitrije Srbu
 Milan Srećo 1/0 (2004–2005)
 Borče Sredojević 47/1 (1988–1989)
 Sreten Sretenović 3/0 (2012–2013)
 Ivan Stamenković
 Perica Stančeski 1/0 (2005–2006)
 Branislav Stanić 1/0 (2007–2008)
 Milan Stanić
 Dragan Stanisavljević 1/0 (1954–1955)
 Scoop Stanisic 56/0 (1983–1984)
 Stanković
 Ivan Stanković 9/0 (2001–2002)
 Vojislav Stanković 103/1 (2010–2015)
 Aleksandar Stanojević 53/0 (1998–2001)
 Vujadin Stanojković 147/10 (1989–1993)
 Slobodan Stanojlović 1/0 (2019–2020)
 Nenad Stavrić 2/0 (1981–1982)
 Dimitrije Stefanović 15/0 (1952–1954)
 Mileta Stefanović
 Vojo Stefanović
 Alen Stevanović 47/6 (2015–2017)
 Filip Stevanović 72/13 (2018–2021)
 Goran Stevanović 177/29 (1983–1991)
 Ivan Stevanović 57/4 (2008–2009, 2010–2011)
 Miladin Stevanović 14/1 (2014–2016)
 Miodrag Stevanović 6/0 (1979–1980)
 Nemanja Stevanović
 Siniša Stevanović 21/0 (2009–2010)
 Bogdan Stević 1/0 (2008–2009)
 Miroslav Stević 4/0 (1988–1989)
 Mladen Stipić
 Slaven Stjepanović 10/1 (2007–2008)
 Žarko Stojadinović
 Nenad Stojaković 4/0 (1999–2000)
 Milan Stojanovski 128/9 (1998–2000, 2001–2004)
 Slavko Stojanović 162/1 (1951–1960)
 Tomislav Stojanović
 Ranko Stojić 100/0 (1980–1984)
 Miloš Stojičić 3/0 (1999–2000)
 Dragan Stojisavljević 89/6 (1996–2000)
 Aco Stojkov 1/0 (2006–2007)
 Dennis Stojković
 Nenad Stojković 270/9 (1974–1984)
 Vladimir Stojković 255/1 (2010–2014, 2017–2021)
 Nebojša Stojmenović
 Lazar Stokić
 Ilija Stolica 6/0 (2000–2002)
 Zvonko Strnad 23/7 (1947–1949)
 Albert Stroni
 Nenad Studen 1/0 (2000–2001)
 Aleksandar Subić 15/0 (2015–2016)
 Miralem Sulejmani 1/0 (2005–2006)
 Đorđe Svetličić 122/5 (1993–1999)
 Stanko Svitlica 1/0 (1995–1996)

Š

 Šaban
 Branimir Šabanović
 Kujtim Shala 28/2 (1983–1984)
 Ivan Šaponjić 42/11 (2013–2016)
 Bojan Šaranov 23/0 (2016–2017)
 Nikola Štulić 26/1 (2020–2022)
 Aleksandar Šćekić 133/12 (2018–2022)
 Marko Šćepović 68/21 (2010–2013)
 Slađan Šćepović 156/30 (1984–1992)
 Stefan Šćepović 25/8 (2012–2013)
 Zlatan Šehović 25/0 (2018–2020, 2022-)
 Silvester Šereš 14/1 (1946–1948)
 Vasilije Šijaković 11/5 (1950–1952)
 Slobodan Šipka
 Dalibor Škorić 5/0 (1993–1994)
 Petar Škuletić 40/28 (2014–2015)
 Bojan Šljivančanin 1/1 (2005–2006)
 Milutin Šoškić 208/0 (1955–1966)
 Rajko Šoškić
 Slobodan Šoškić
 Franjo Šoštarić 104/0 (1946–1953)
 Pavle Šovljanski
 Uroš Španović
 Gyula Spitz
 Dušan Šuković
 Šepe Šutevski
 Radonja Šutović

T

 Prince Tagoe 18/11 (2010–2011)
 Anton Tapiška
 Igor Taševski 147/2 (1994–1998)
 Léandre Tawamba 70/21 (2017–2018)
 Milan Tepić
 Darko Tešović 154/29 (1993–1999)
 Aranđel Todorović 98/4 (1973–1980)
 Mirko Todorović 17/3 (1994–1995)
 Slobodan Todorović 26/0 (1971–1974)
 Stefan Todorović
 Đorđe Tomić 93/21 (1992–1994, 1998–2000)
 Ivan Tomić 179/31 (1993–1998, 2004–2007)
 Nemanja Tomić 158/31 (2008–2013)
 Predrag Tomić 41/1 (1973–1977)
 Miodrag Torbarov 9/0 (1950–1952)
 Milorad Tošić
 Zoran Tošić 142/44 (2007–2008, 2017–2020)
 Trajković
 Branislav Trajković 14/0 (2014)
 Viktor Trenevski 106/24 (1994–1998)
 Goran Trifković
 Aleksandar Trifunović 230/23 (1975–1983)
 Tihomir Trifunović
 Goran Trobok 237/18 (1997–2003)
 Nikola Trujić 13/3 (2015–2016)

U

 Ismet Ugljanin
 Slobodan Urošević 191/16 (2018–)
 Dejan Urumov

V

 Yuriy Vakulko 2/0 (2017–2018)
 Marc Valiente 41/1 (2018–2019)
 Marko Valok 196/124 (1947–1959)
 Zvonko Varga 227/63 (1978–1986)
 Vasić
 Dimitrije Vasiljević
 Petar Vasiljević 68/5 (1990–1994)
 Velibor Vasović 155/4 (1958–1963, 1964–1966)
 Vladimir Vermezović 166/4 (1981–1989)
 Borko Veselinović 21/1 (2002–2008)
 Todor Veselinović 28/16 (1952–1953)
 Vidaković
 Videnović
 Miloš Vidović 28/1 (1965–1969)
 Joakim Vislavski 129/32 (1959–1967)
 Josip Višnjić 44/10 (1990–1991)
 Milan Vještica 9/0 (2008)
 Dušan Vlahović 27/3 (2015–2017)
 Vlaisavljević
 Fadil Vokrri 68/24 (1986–1989)
 Vladimir Volkov 112/10 (2011–2015)
 Stevan Vorgić 6/2 (1949–1954)
 Ljubomir Vorkapić 78/28 (1991–1994)
 Zoran Vraneš 20/1 (1973–1975)
 Nebojša Vranić
 Miodrag Vranješ 4/0 (1974–1975)
 Nebojša Vučićević 169/35 (1984–1989)
 Branimir Vučković 1/0 (1970–1971)
 Budimir Vujačić 151/16 (1989–1993)
 Nikola Vujović 19/3 (2008–2009)
 Slobodan Vujović
 Vlastimir Vukadinović
 Vladimir Vukajlović 1/0 (2005–2006)
 Simon Vukčević 76/15 (2002–2006)
 Milan Vukelić 178/31 (1958–1969)
 Ljubiša Vukelja 14/0 (2006–2007)
 Zvonimir Vukić 156/72 (1999–2003, 2006, 2010–2012)
 Dejan Vukićević 73/16 (1995–1998)
 Momčilo Vukotić 429/118 (1967–1978, 1979–1984)
 Aleksandar Vuković 27/3 (1998–2000)
 Novica Vulić 31/0 (1972–1978)
 Miroslav Vulićević 156/1 (2014–2019)

W

 Washington 27/6 (2009–2010)
 Taribo West 23/1 (2003–2004)

Z

 Mohammad Za'abia 9/1 (2012-2013)
 Zlatko Zahovič 47/7 (1991-1993)
 Kamel Zaiem 7/0 (2008-2009)
 Bojan Zajić 34/6 (2006-2007)
 Boško Zaklan
 Rade Zalad 75/0 (1978-1983)
 Bojan Zavišić 13/0 (2002-2004)
 Ilija Zavišić 193/28 (1971-1980)
 Saša Zdjelar 197/6 (2018-2022)
 Branko Zebec 148/48 (1952-1958)
 Bogdan Zlatić
 Marko Zorić 4/1 (2000-2001)
 Vladimir Zović

Ž

 Miodrag Živaljević 142/20 (1969-1975)
 Bogoljub Živanović
 Aleksandar Živković 4/0 (1994-1995)
 Andrija Živković 93/24 (2012-2015)
 Dejan Živković 13/1 (1999-2000, 2002-2003)
 Drago Živković
 Marko Živković
 Zvonko Živković 216/70 (1978-1986)
 Živko Živković 53/0 (2007-08, 2010-11, 2012-16)
 Žumbar
 Bajro Župić 114/0 (1985-1990)

Partizan players without official appearances
Includes players that spent time on contract with FK Partizan but did not make any official appearances, players that played in the Belgrade League, Mitleuropa Cup, guest players, players on trial with non-official appearances, and players with appearances for the reserve (B) team. Note: some players are attributed Serbian (domestic) nationality by default.

 Dušan Aksentijević
 Fahad Al Enezi
 Alan
 Dražen Aleksić
 Alex
 Petar Alfirević 
 Alfred Emuejeraye
 Josip Ančić 
 Goran Anđelić
 Siniša Angelovski
 Goran Antelj – Guest
 Sava Antić – BSK
 Miloje Arsenijević
 Nikola Arsić
 Zoran Arsić
 Nenad Atanasijević
 Dušan Avramović
 Babanović – Guest
 Dragan Babić
 Dragutin Babić
 Ivan Babić
 Backović 
 Željko Bajić – Guest
 Mike Bakić
 Miroslav Baralić
 Goran Basara
 Dušan Bašić
 Bego 
 Jovan Beleslin
 Aleksandar Benko
 Branimir Bevanda
 Sava Bijelić
 Nikoslav Bjegović
 Miodrag Bogdanović
 Dejan Boljević
 Vlado Borozan
 Vujadin Boškov – Vojvodina
 Boško Boškovič
 Strahinja Bošnjak
 Nebojša Botunjac
 Velimir Božić
 Vojin Božović
 Branimirović
 Dušan Brković
 Broz
 Buljugić
 Andrés Cabrero
 Car 
 Nemanja Crnoglavac
 Slobodan Cvetićanin 
 Jovan Cvjetković
 Jovan Čađenović
 Dragan Čalija
 Milivoj Čeleketić
 Petar Čestić
Čimbur
 Đorđe Čokić
Čolić
Čolović
 Stjepan Čordaš
 Simo Čučak
 Nenad Čudić
 Bojan Čukić
 Vladimir Čulik
 Nebojša Čuljković
 Tomislav Ćirković
 Zoran Ćulafić
 Aleksandar Damčevski
 Slavoljub Dačković
 Radoslav Dakić
 Daniel
 Aleksa Denković
 Denkovski – Guest
 Goran Dimitrijević
 Zvonko Dimitrijević
 Žarko Dobrojević
 Dorić – Guest
 Došen – Guest
 Nikola Dragićević
 Drča – Guest
 Radovan Drenjanin
 Milovan Droca
 Miljan Drpljanin
 Duvnjak – Guest
 Zdravko Đekić
 M. Đenić
 Milan Đerić
 Dejan Đokić
 Jovan Đuknić
 Đupić
 Đuričić – Guest
 Elton Martins
 M. Erić
 Fatkhullo Fatkhuloev
 Emil Ferković
 Miloš Filimonović
 Filipović
 Folić 
 Ivica Francišković
 Alessandro Furlan
 Nebojša Gajić
 Zoran Gajić
 Goran Galešić
 Bogdan Galić
 Ilija Galić
 Vladimir Gašić
 Goran Gavrilović
 Dejan Georgijević
 Dimitrije Gligorijević
 Gligorovski
 Golubović
 Zoran Grbić
 Ilija Grubor
 Branislav Guberinić
 Dragan Gugleta
 Srboljub Hadži Mihailović
 Esher Hadžiabdić
 Sead Hadžibulić
 Milorad Hajduković
 Jusmir Hatunić
 Hicman
 Hukić 
 Milorad Ignjatović
 Svetozar Ilić
 Zoran Ilić
 Slobodan Isailović
 Jakovljević
 Dejan Jakšić
 Radisav Janjić
 Srđan Janković
 Željko Janković
 Jerinić
 Jolović
 Saša Jonović
 Slobodan Jovanić
 Jovanov
 B. Jovanović
 Ljubodrag Jovanović
 Milorad Jovanović
 Pavle Jovanović
 Saša Jovanović
 Jovanski
 Juras
 Zdravko Juričko
 Predrag Jušić
 Goran Kadenić
 Domagoj Kapetanović
 Karadžić
 Karić
 Mladen Katić
 Dušan Kerkez
 Slobodan Keserović
 Miroslav Kijanović
 Klajić
 Milorad Kleščić
 Dejan Knežević
 Marko Knežević
 Milan Kobe
 Vasil Kocev
 Jadranko Kodžo
 Kojić
 Konstantinović
 Ivan Konjević
 Korać
 Dušan Korica
 Đorđe Koruga
 Branislav Kovač
 Miroslav Kovačević
 Nedeljko Kovačević
 Kozlovski
 Ahmed Krajišnik 
 Kraka
 Branko Kralj
 Zoran Kraljević
 Miroslav Krndija
 Jovan Krneta
 Jozo Krnić
 Krnjavac
 Vladan Krsmanović
 Dragić Krstić
 Lazar Krstić
 Slaviša Krstić
 Leandro Kuszko
 Jevđenije Kušić
 Goran Kuzmanović
 Vinko Kužet
 Mirko Labus
 Adolf Lambi
 Vladimir Lapčević
 O. Lazić
 Nemanja Lekanić
 Lekić
 Apollon Lemondzhava
 Lendar
 Darin Lewis
 Željko Lilić
 Lazo Liposki
 Izet Ljejić
 Ljubenović
 Matija Ljujić
 Nikica Lopičić
 Lovrić
 Luizão
 Nedeljko Lukač
 Aco Lukić
 Nenad Lukić
 Živko Lukić
 Majer 
 Borislav Majkić
 Luka Malešev
 Nikola Mandić
 Mar
 Marčetić
 Baja Marić
 Enver Marić
 Ljubomir Marić
 Borko Marinković
 Bora Marković
 Branislav Marković
 Filip Marković
 Ilija Marković
 Marko Marković
 Nebojša Marković
 Nenad Marković
 Marko Marović
 Dušan Martinović
 Stracimir Martinović
 Vladimir Martinović
 Oladipupo Martins
 Matković
 Dušan Mićić
 Branko Mihajlović
 Petar Mihajlović
 Milovan Mihić
 Andrija Mijailović
 Mijatov
 Ljubiša Milačić
 Ivica Milaković
 Milan Milanović
 Milivojević
 Stefan Milojević
 Vladimir Milosavljević
 Boris Milošević
 Branislav Milošević
 Radoslav Milošević
 Nemanja Milovanović
 Slobodan Milovanović
 Stefan Milovanović
 Branko Mirjačić
 Nemanja Mirković
 Dragan Mišić
 Rajko Mitić
 Tomislav Mitić
 Aleksandar Mitrović
 Boris Mitrović
 Dimitrije Mitrović
 Filip Mitrović
 Stefan Mitrović
 Rade Mojović
 Franjo Monsider
 Antonio Moreno
 Mornar
 Možgon
 Ivan Mršić
 Igor Mudrinić
 Fikret Mujkić
 Mirsad Musić
 Mutibarić
 Andréa Mbuyi-Mutombo
 Milenko Nakić
 Slavko Narančić
 Matija Nastasić
 Nedeljković
 Nenadić
 Bojan Neziri
 Dragoljub Nikolić
 Dragomir Nikolić
 Miloš Nikolić
 Vančo Nikolovski
 Jari Niinimäki
 Ninković
 Nišanđinski
 Norčić
 Novaković
 Michael Nzekwe 
 Tihomir Ognjanov
 Okanović
 Goran Olarević
 Slobodan Olarević
 Zoran Olarević
 Olužina
 Peter Omoduemuke
 Amer Osmanagić
 Vladan Ostojić
 Bogdan Pantelić
 Zlatko Papec
 Papeš
 Slaviša Pavić
 Uroš Pavićević
 Pavkov
 Predrag Pavlović
 Nemanja Pavlović
 Nebojša Pavlovski
 Franjo Pazmanj
 Milan Perendija
 Andrejs Perepļotkins
 Miloš Perišić
 Duško Perović
 Radivoje Perović
 Dušan Petković
 Goran Petković
 Milan Petković
 Matija Petrović
 Milan Petrović
 Saša Petrović
 Danilo Pilica
 Zoran Piljak
 Tomislav Pitner
 Milojko Pivljaković
 Plećević
 Emir Plojović
 Milan Pojužina
 Nikola Popara
 Jovan Popov
 Alojz Popović 
 Mirko Popovski
 Dušan Potkonjak
 Premović
 Miodrag Prlinčević
 Dražen Prša
 Petar Puača
 Dragan Radaković
 Dušan Radaković
 Vanja Radinović
 Aleksandar Radivojević
 Radovanov
 Mijodrag Radović
 Filip Raičević
 Nebojša Rajačić
 Rajić – Guest
 Rajkov
 Zoran Rakas
 Darko Ramovš
 Predrag Ranđelović
 Miroslav Ranković
 Zoran Rendulić
 Relić
 Ristanović
 Dragan Ristić
 Nikola Ristić
 Goran Ristović
 Zoran Ristović
 Bane Rnić
 Petar Rodić
 Marin Romić – Guest
 Gaston Rossi
 Dragoslav Rudić
 Aleksandar Ružičić
 Claude Rygan
 Dramane Salou
 Danijel Savić
 Milan Savić
 Stefan Savić
 Dragomir Sedlarević
 Elbrus Sejdiu
 Rahim Sherifi
 Jovo Simanić
 Simić
 Nebojša Sitarica
 Dragan Skenderija
 Josip Skoblar
 Branko Smileski
 Branko Smiljanić
 Dejan Smiljanić
 Zoran Smiljanić
 Dragan Spasić
 Milutin Spasić
 Petar Spremić
 Ljubomir Srđanov
 Petar Stakić
 Petar Stamenić
 Radivoje Stamenković
 Stamenov – Guest
 Stamenović – Guest
 Filip Stanisavljević
 Milan Stanisavljević
 Dejan Stanković
 Mileta Stanković
 Starčević – Guest
 Miodrag Stefanović – Guest
 Stešević – Guest
 Artūras Steško – Guest
 Igoris Steško – Guest
 Dragan Stevanović
 Momčilo Stjepanović
 Stoisavljević – Guest
 Miodrag Stojaković
 Steva Stojanac
 Dušan Stojanović
 Jovan Stojanović – Guest
 Dejan Stojić
 Milanko Stojić
 Sava Stojiljković
 Nemanja Stojković
 Nebojša Stojmenović
 Miroslav Stojnić
 Vladica Stolić
 Tibor Szabó
 Miloš Šaka
 Branko Šarenac
 Šebalj
 Vladan Šerić
 Vladimir Šević
 Mišo Šijačić
 Špirić – Guest
 Dragan Šteković
 Borivoje Šuljagić
 Šutić
 Ivan Švaljek
 Artur Takač
 Silvester Takač – Guest
 Milan Tanasijević
 Dejan Tasić
 Boris Teoharević
 Zoran Tešović
 Valeriu Tiron
 Filippo Tiscione
 Stevo Tomašević
 Žarko Tomašević
 Jovan Tomić
 Tot
 Dražen Tovilović
 Dušan Trbojević
 Blažimir Trifunović
 Veljko Trifunović
 Ljubiša Tumbaković
 Dejan Urumov
 Vajda 
 Varađanin
 Đorđe Vasić
 Darko Vasiljević
 Velić
 Milan Velinov
 Zoran Veseličić
 Vibra
 Dragan Vidović
 Viđak 
 Viktorović
 Vitković
 Dragoslav Vitorović
 Miodrag Vitorović
 Franjo Vladić – Guest
 Vogrinc
 Zoran Vranković
 Jovan Vratan 
 Jovan Vučinić
 Miroslav Vučinić
 Bojan Vučković
 Zoran Vučković
 Dušan Vujačić
 Zoran Vujičić
 Vujković
 Vujović – Guest
 Zoran Vujović
 Zoran Vukčević
 Draško Vukosavljević
 Marko Vuković
 Živomir Vulović
 Wellingsson de Souza
 Đorđe Zafirović
 Zagorac
 Zagorščak
 Miodrag Zavišić
 Zečević
 Zoran Zekić
 Srđan Zindović
 Milan Zivlak
 Zlatanoski – Guest
 Zlatković
 Igor Zonjić
 Žarak
 Žigman
 Aleksandar Živaljević – Guest
 Mladen Živaljević
 Živančević
 Marko Živanović
 Miloš Živanović
 Živkov
 Rajko Živković
 Žuljević

The Best Eleven
In 1995, Partizan celebrated half a century of its existence. Partizanov vesnik, official fan magazine, organized a massive poll in order to choose the best player and the best team in club's history, called Magnificent Eleven. The players chosen in the poll were:

Goalkeeper
  Milutin Šoškić (5.910 votes)
Defenders
  Bruno Belin (5.958)
  Velibor Vasović (5.496)
  Branko Zebec (5.218)
  Fahrudin Jusufi (4.300)
Midfielders
  Zlatko Čajkovski (5.244)
 / Predrag Mijatović (4.946)
  Miloš Milutinović (4.728)
  Momčilo Vukotić (4.558)
Forwards
  Stjepan Bobek (6.272)
  Milan Galić (5.058)

Notes
The players that played during Yugoslav period have represented the flag that would correspond to the current countries, that were the correspondent Yugoslav republics back then.

See also
 List of Red Star Belgrade footballers
 List of FK Vojvodina players

References

 1946/1991 all seasons league stats for FK Partizan at EX YU Fudbal

External sources
 List of all-time players from Partizan official website

 
Lists of association football players by club in Serbia
Association football player non-biographical articles